Massimo Troisi: Somebody Down There Likes Me is a 2023 Italian documentary film co-written and directed by Mario Martone. The documentary film is a Mario Martone's personal journey in Massimo Troisi's cinema. By assembling the scenes of his films, Martone wants to highlight Troisi as a great director of our cinema even before being a great comic actor. It was selected at the 73rd Berlin International Film Festival in Berlinale Special, where it had its world premiere on 17 February 2023. It was released in cinemas on 23 February 2023.

Content of the film

Massimo Troisi lived through 1953 to 1994. His last film was the 1994 comedy drama Il Postino: The Postman. He was a stage actor and film director and his understanding of comedy, keen observations of the intimate and political relationships between men and women is a source of inspiration for an entire generation. The film is a Mario Martone's personal journey in his cinema. He collected the scenes of his films, and highlighted Troisi as a great director.

Cast
 Francesco Piccolo
 Anna Pavignano
 Valeria Pezza
 Goffredo Fofi
 Paolo Sorrentino
 Salvo Ficarra
 Valentino Picone
 Michael Redford
 Roberto Perpignani
 Sentieri Selvaggi

Release
Massimo Troisi: Somebody Down There Likes Me had its  premiere on 17 February 2023 as part of the 73rd Berlin International Film Festival, in Berlinale Special. It was released in cinemas on 23 February 2023.

Reception
Vittoria Scarpa reviewing for Cineuropa praised the film and wrote, "this sincere tale that Martone dedicates to a beloved and regretted fellow citizen, a tender homage "from director to director" that for two hours takes the spectator back in time, to an unrepeatable creative period." Andrew Murray in his review in The Upcoming rated the film with 3 stars out of 5 and wrote, "[T]his picture is an endearing celebration and testament to the man from those who knew him best."

References

External links
 
 
 Massimo Troisi: Somebody Down There Likes Me at Berlinale
 

2023 films
2020s Italian films
Italian documentary films
2023 documentary films
2020s Italian-language films